South Hay is a hamlet within the civil parish of Kingsley in the East Hampshire district of Hampshire, England.

Hamlets in Hampshire
East Hampshire District